Sous Lieutenant Pierre Pendaries (born 21 June 1894, date of death unknown) was a World War I flying ace credited with seven aerial victories.

Biography
Pierre Pendaries was born in Chambéry, France on 21 June 1894.

Pendaries was inducted into the infantry early in World War I, on 4 September 1914. On 17 December 1914, his infantry career was cut short by a terrible wounding. After he finally recovered, he was forwarded to be a student pilot on 19 August 1915. On 17 January 1916, he received his Military Pilot's Brevet. On 6 May 1916, he began flying combat with Escadrille N.69.

Shortly after his third victory, he was awarded the Médaille militaire on 28 May 1917. On 3 June, he again was seriously wounded. His recuperation was not complete until 2 February 1918, when he was assigned to Escadrille SPA.67. Having progressed through the enlisted ranks, he was promoted to Sous lieutenant on 28 March 1918.

By war's end on 11 November 1918, Pierre Pendaries had flown 1,180 combat hours. In addition to the Médaille militaire, he won the Legion d'honneur and the Croix de Guerre with seven palms.

Pendaries was demobilized from the French military on 21 September 1919. At some later date, he was upgraded in the Legion d'honneur to Commandeur.

List of aerial victories
See also Aerial victory standards of World War I

Confirmed victories are numbered and listed chronologically. Unconfirmed victories are denoted by "u/c" and may or may not be listed by date.

End notes

Reference
 Franks, Norman; Bailey, Frank (1993). Over the Front: The Complete Record of the Fighter Aces and Units of the United States and French Air Services, 1914–1918 London, UK: Grub Street Publishing. .

1894 births
Year of death missing
French World War I flying aces
Military personnel from Chambéry
Recipients of the Croix de Guerre 1914–1918 (France)
Commandeurs of the Légion d'honneur